Andrena olivacea is a species of mining bee in the family Andrenidae. It is found in North America.

References

Further reading

 
 

olivacea
Articles created by Qbugbot
Insects described in 1916